Richard Stratt is an American chemist and physicist, currently the Newport Rogers Professor and also formerly the Harrison S. Kravis Professor from 1999 to 2000, at Brown University, focusing with theoretical chemistry, molecular dynamics in liquids and ultrafast spectroscopy.

References

Year of birth missing (living people)
Living people
Brown University faculty
21st-century American chemists
21st-century American physicists